The Gymnasium Alexandrinum in Mariupol, Ukraine, is a cultural property of a historical place indexed in the Ukrainian heritage register under the reference 14-123-0007. It was the first boys' gymnasium of Mariupol. The gymnasium was built in 1876 upon the initiative of the Russian Emperor Alexander II of Russia. The building was named after Emperor Alexander II. It was built and designed by the architect  (1857–1924).

References

Sources 

 

Buildings and structures in Mariupol
Education in Mariupol
History of Mariupol
Architecture in Mariupol
Gymnasiums in Ukraine